Presque Isle (meaning 'almost island') may refer to:

Canada
 Presqu'île crater in Quebec
 Presqu'ile Provincial Park along Lake Ontario in Ontario
 Presqu'île-Robillard Ecological Reserve in Quebec

France
 Presqu'île, a district in Lyon, France

United States

Administrative subdivisions
 Presque Isle, Maine, a city
 Presque Isle Air Force Base, former base
 Presque Isle Township, Michigan
 Presque Isle County, Michigan
 Presque Isle, Wisconsin, a town
 Presque Isle (community), Wisconsin, an unincorporated community

Geographic and historical features

Maine
 Presque Isle, Maine

Michigan
 Presque Isle, Michigan, a peninsula in the Northern Lower Peninsula
 Presque Isle Front Range Light 
 Presque Isle Harbor Breakwater Light 
 Old Presque Isle Light 
 New Presque Isle Light
 Presque Isle Rear Range Light 
 Presque Isle River
 Little Presque Isle River
 Presque Isle Park, a cape on Lake Superior near the city of Marquette, Michigan
 Presque Isle Power Plant near Marquette

Pennsylvania
 Presque Isle Bay
 Presque Isle Light
 Presque Isle State Park
 Fort Presque Isle
 Presque Isle Downs & Casino

Virginia
 Presquile National Wildlife Refuge on the James River in Virginia
 Presquile Plantation, a former 18th-century plantation on the James River and now the location of the Presquile NWR

Other
 La Presqu’île, title of a collection by French writer Julien Gracq
 24779 Presque Isle, an asteroid

See also
 Presque-isle